Baisi is a City and Sub District in Purnia district of Bihar, India.

Demographics
The majority of people in the town are Sunni Muslims.

The number of households in Baisi is 1,319. All the households are rural households.

The female to male ratio of Baisi is 95.72% compared to the Bihar's female to male ratio of 91.93%.

The literacy rate of the town is 35.98% compared to the literacy rate of state 47%. 

The female literacy rate is 21.39% compared to male literacy rate of 50.05%.

Education
This small town is very popular in that area because this town has more than 20 small and secondary  schools which provide very good job in education sector .

There are hundreds of students coming from near by villages to take primary education.
And there is a Baisi degree college from where now students can complete his/her graduation degree.And there is also a Government secondary school for girls which is popularly known as "Project Girls School" which provides very good education.

Location
 passes through Baisi. SH 99 connects Baisi with the nearby towns of Rauta and Amour.

References

External links
 About Baisi
 Satellite map of Baisi

Cities and towns in Purnia district